The Wildau Institute of Technology (WIT) is an institute of further education at higher university level. The WIT is affiliated to the Technical University of Applied Sciences Wildau (TH Wildau - Technische Hochschule Wildau (FH)), and was established in 2004.

Study programmes

 Master of Business Administration (two years, part-time, 25% English, 75% German, accredited by ACQUIN)
 Master in Aviation Management (two years, part-time, English, accredited by ACQUIN)
 Master in Bibliotheksinformatik (two years, part-time, German)

External links
Website of Wildau Institute of Technology
Website of TH Wildau

Related fields
List of universities in Germany
Dahme-Spreewald

Educational institutions established in 2005
Universities and colleges in Brandenburg
2005 establishments in Germany